Hoyos del Espino is a municipality located in the province of Ávila, Castile and León, Spain. According to the 2011 census (INE), the municipality has a population of 444 inhabitants.

The village holds the music festival "Músicos en la naturaleza" (Musicians in nature), where world-known artists like Sting, Bob Dylan or Deep Purple have performed since the first edition, which took place in 2006.

References 

Municipalities in the Province of Ávila